The 2017–18 Howard Bison men's basketball team represented Howard University during the 2017–18 NCAA Division I men's basketball season. The Bison, led by eighth-year head coach Kevin Nickelberry, played their home games at Burr Gymnasium in Washington, D.C. as members of the Mid-Eastern Athletic Conference. They finished the season 10–23, 7–9 in MEAC play to finish in a three-way tie for seventh place. As the No. 8 seed in the MEAC tournament, they lost in the first round to Florida A&M.

Previous season
The Bison finished the 2016–17 season 10–24, 5–11 in MEAC play to finish in a tie for 11th place. They defeated Coppin State and Morgan State in the MEAC tournament before losing in the semifinals to Norfolk State.

Preseason
The Bison were picked to finish in eighth place in a preseason poll of league coaches. Senior G/F Charles Williams was named to the preseason All-MEAC first team.

Roster

Schedule and results

|-
!colspan=9 style=| Non-conference regular season

|-
!colspan=9 style=|MEAC regular season

|-
!colspan=9 style=| MEAC tournament

Source

Awards and honors

References

Howard Bison men's basketball seasons
Howard Bison
Howard
Howard